Roman GianArthur is an American musician, singer, songwriter and record producer known for his collaborations with artists Janelle Monáe and Jidenna. He is a member of Monae's Wondaland Arts Collective, and was featured on Jidenna's Grammy-nominated single "Classic Man". He has also contributed to Monae's albums The ArchAndroid and The Electric Lady. His single "iKnow" was featured on the EP Wondaland Presents: The Eephus. In September 2015, Rolling Stone named GianArthur to a list of "10 New Artists You Need to Know."

GianArthur's older brother is Nate "Rocket" Wonder, another member of Monae's Wondaland collective.

Discography 
 OK LADY (2015 EP)

References

External links 
  Wondaland site

Living people
American multi-instrumentalists
African-American guitarists
African-American pianists
20th-century African-American male singers
1988 births
American male pianists
American male guitarists
21st-century American singers
21st-century American pianists
21st-century American guitarists
21st-century American male singers
21st-century African-American male singers